Oxynoemacheilus zagrosensis is a species of stone loach which is endemic to the Choman River in Iranian Kurdistan. It was described along with O. chomanicus, O. kurdistanicus and Turcinoemacheilus kosswigi in 2014, all four species being endemic to the Choman basin.

References

zagrosensis
Endemic fauna of Iran
Fish described in 2014
Taxa named by Barzan Bahrami Kamangar
Taxa named by Artem Mikhailovich Prokofiev
Taxa named by Edris Ghaderi
Taxa named by Teodor T. Nalbant